The Egerton Gospel (British Library Egerton Papyrus 2) refers to a collection of three papyrus fragments of a codex of a previously unknown gospel, found in Egypt and sold to the British Museum in 1934; the physical fragments are now dated to the very end of the 2nd century CE. Together they comprise one of the oldest surviving witnesses to any gospel, or any codex. The British Museum lost no time in publishing the text: acquired in the summer of 1934, it was in print in 1935. It is also called the Unknown Gospel, as no ancient source makes reference to it, in addition to being entirely unknown before its publication.

Provenance
Three fragments of the manuscript form part of the Egerton Collection in the British Library.  A fourth fragment of the same manuscript has since been identified in the papyrus collection of the University of Cologne.

The provenance of the four fragments is a matter of some dispute. Throughout the 20th century the provenance of the Egerton fragments was kept anonymous, with the initial editors suggesting without proof that they came from the Oxyrhynchus Papyri. In 2019 it was established that they were purchased in 1934 from Maurice Nahman, an antiquities dealer in Cairo. Nahman purchased the manuscript sometime between the 1920s and 1934, without recording its origin. Nahman bragged that he had many origins for his manuscripts. The Oxyrynchus identification is thus in question. The Cologne fragment was deposited without any provenance whatsoever. Circumstantial evidence suggests that this was purchased from Nahman's estate at the time of his death in 1954.

Colin Henderson Roberts reported seeing an account of the Passion of Jesus in Nahman's collection. Other Biblical scholars urgently pursued this missing fragment, but Nahman's collection was sold off indiscriminately to many different European universities and private collectors. The names of buyers were not recorded and the final whereabouts of this fragment, if it exists, are unknown.

Contents
The surviving fragments include four stories: 1) a controversy similar to John 5:39-47 and 10:31-39; 2) curing a leper similar to Matt 8:1-4, Mark 1:40-45, Luke 5:12-16 and Luke 17:11-14; 3) a controversy about paying tribute to Caesar analogous to Matt 22:15-22, Mark 12:13-17, Luke 20:20-26; and 4) an incomplete account of a miracle on the Jordan River bank, perhaps carried out to illustrate  the parable about seeds growing miraculously. The latter story has no equivalent in canonical Gospels:
Jesus walked and stood on the bank of the Jordan river; he reached out his right hand, and filled it.... And he sowed it on the... And then...water...and...before their eyes; and it brought forth fruit...many...for joy...

Dating the manuscript

The date of the manuscript is established through paleography alone. Later, when an additional papyrus fragment of the Egerton Gospel text was identified in the University of Cologne collection (Papyrus Köln 255) and published in 1987, it was found to fit on the bottom of one of the British Library papyrus pages. In this additional fragment a single use of a hooked apostrophe in between two consonants was observed, a practice that became standard in Greek punctuation at the beginning of the 3rd century; and this sufficed to revise the date of the Egerton manuscript.

The revised dating for the Egerton Papyrus continues to carry wide support. The 1987 redating of the Egerton Papyrus had rested on a comment made by Eric Turner in 1971 "in the first decade of III AD this practice (of using an apostrophe between two consonants, such as double mutes or double liquids) suddenly becomes extremely common, and then persists.". Porter notes that Turner had then nevertheless advanced several earlier dated examples of the practice from the later second century, and one (BGU III 715.5) dated to 101 CE. Porter proposes that, notwithstanding the discovery of the hooked apostrophe in P. Köln 255, the original editors' proposal of a mid second century date for the Egerton Papyrus accords better with the paleographic evidence of dated comparator documentary and literary hands for both  and this papyrus "the middle of the second century, perhaps tending towards the early part of it".

Date of composition
Jon B. Daniels writes the following in his introduction in The Complete Gospels:

On the one hand, some scholars have maintained that Egerton's unknown author composed by borrowing from the canonical gospels. This solution has not proved satisfactory for several reasons: The Egerton Gospel's parallels to the synoptic gospels lack editorial language peculiar to the synoptic authors, Matthew, Mark, and Luke. They also lack features that are common to the synoptic gospels, a difficult fact to explain if those gospels were Egerton's source.

On the other hand, suggestions that the Egerton Gospel served as a source for the authors of Mark and/or John also lack conclusive evidence. The most likely explanation for the Egerton Gospel's similarities and differences from the canonical gospels is that Egerton's author made independent use of traditional sayings and stories of Jesus that also were used by the other gospel writers.

Such traditional sayings are posited for the hypothetical Q Document. Ronald Cameron states: "Since Papyrus Egerton 2 displays no dependence upon the gospels of the New Testament, its earliest possible date of composition would be sometime in the middle of the first century, when the sayings and stories which underlie the New Testament first began to be produced in written form. The latest possible date would be early in the second century, shortly before the copy of the extant papyrus fragment was made. Because this papyrus presents traditions in a less developed form than John does, it was probably composed in the second half of the first century, in Syria, shortly before the Gospel of John was written."

Helmut Koester and J. D. Crossan have argued that despite its apparent historical importance, the text is not well known.  It is a mere fragment, and does not bear a clear relationship to any of the four canonical gospels. The Egerton Gospel has been largely ignored outside a small circle of scholars. The work cannot be dismissed as "apocrypha" or "heretical" without compromising the orthodoxy of the Gospel of John. Nor can it be classed as "gnostic" and dismissed as marginal. It seems to be almost independent of the synoptic gospels and to represent a tradition similar to the canonical John, but independent of it. Additionally it tells us an otherwise unknown miracle, in the Johannine manner.

Evangelical scholar Craig Evans supports a date for the Egerton Gospel later than the canonical Gospels in a variety of ways. He finds many parallels between the Egerton Gospel and the canonical Gospels that include editorial language particular to Matthew and Luke. While Koester argues that these show a tradition before the other gospels, Craig Evans sees these as drawing from the other Gospels just as Justin Martyr did. He also finds words such as the plural "priests" that show lack of knowledge of Jewish customs.

See also
List of Gospels
New Testament apocrypha

Notes

Citations

References
 Bell, Idris and Skeat, T.C. Fragments of an Unknown Gospel and other Early Christian Papyri. Oxford, OUP, 1935.
 
 Ronald Cameron, editor. The Other Gospels: Non-Canonical Gospel Texts, 1982
 Porter, Stanley E. (2013) "Recent efforts to Reconstruct Early Christianity on the Basis of its Papyrological Evidence" in Christian Origins and Graeco-Roman Culture, Eds. Stanley Porter and Andrew Pitts, Leiden, Brill, pp 71–84.

External links

The PAPYRUS EGERTON 2 Homepage Detailed description of the manuscript, with many images. Greek and English text and reconstruction. 
Early Christian Writings website: text, commentary, links.

1st-century Christian texts
2nd-century manuscripts
Agrapha of Jesus and apocryphal fragments
Lost apocrypha
Egerton collection
Papyrus
Texts in Koine Greek
Works of unknown authorship